Blackfoot River can refer to:

 Blackfoot River (Idaho)
 Blackfoot River (Montana)
Little Blackfoot River, also in Montana